Patrick Paauwe (born 27 December 1975) is a Dutch former professional footballer who played as a defender.

Club career
Paauwe played as a defender in the past but for Feyenoord Rotterdam as a defensive midfielder role. Other teams he served are PSV Eindhoven, De Graafschap, Fortuna Sittard, Valenciennes FC and VVV Venlo. Paauwe is a one-time winner of the Dutch Eredivisie (in 1999) and the UEFA Cup (in 2002), both with Feyenoord. After two years with Borussia Mönchengladbach, he returned to his native Netherlands and signed for VVV-Venlo. He retired from professional football on 31 January 2011.

International career
Paauwe has been capped five times by the Netherlands national team.

Personal life
His brother Cees Paauwe is also a former professional footballer.

Career statistics

International

Honours

Club
Feyenoord
 Eredivisie: 1998–99
 Johan Cruyff Shield: 1999
UEFA Cup: 2001–02

References

External links

1975 births
Living people
Footballers from Dronten
Association football midfielders
Dutch expatriate footballers
Expatriate footballers in Germany
Expatriate footballers in France
Dutch expatriate sportspeople in France
Dutch footballers
Netherlands international footballers
PSV Eindhoven players
De Graafschap players
Feyenoord players
Fortuna Sittard players
Valenciennes FC players
Borussia Mönchengladbach players
VVV-Venlo players
UEFA Cup winning players
Eredivisie players
Ligue 1 players
Bundesliga players
2. Bundesliga players
Netherlands under-21 international footballers